is a principle local road that stretches from Ōta in Tokyo to Tsurumi-ku, Yokohama in Kanagawa.

Route description
The Tokyo, Kawasaki and Yokohama sections of the road have a length of 763, 6,540,
and 3,520 m respectively.

References

Roads in Tokyo
Roads in Kanagawa Prefecture
Prefectural roads in Japan